The 2006–07 ABN-AMRO Twenty-20 Cup was the third edition of the ABN-AMRO Twenty-20 Cup, a domestic Twenty20 tournament in Pakistan. It was held in Karachi from 21 to 26 December 2006. The tournament was reduced to a shorter format similar to the 2004–05 edition with 18 matches. The Sialkot Stallions successfully defended the title by defeating the Karachi Dolphins in the final.

Format
The 13 teams are divided into four groups: Pool A with four teams, Pool B, C and D with three each. Each group plays a single Round-robin tournament and the top team from each group advances to the semi-finals. The winners of the semi-finals play the final.

The position of the teams in the points table is determined by:
Total points
Won
Lost (fewest)
Net run rate

Prize money
The prize money was increased from the previous year, with the winners receiving almost twice that of the previous year.

 Final
 Winners: Rs. 1,000,000
 Runners-up: Rs. 500,000
 Match victories
 Winners of group matches: Rs. 15,000
 Losers of group matches: Rs. 10,000
 Winners of semi-finals: Rs. 20,000
 Losers of semi-finals: Rs. 15,000

Results

Teams and standings
The top team from each group qualify for the semi-finals.

 Qualified for semi-finals

Knockout stage

Fixtures

Group stage
Pool A

Pool B

Pool C

Pool D

Knockout stage
Semi-finals

Final

Media coverage
 Geo Super (live)

References

External links
Tournament page on ESPN CricInfo
Tournament page on CricketArchive

Domestic cricket competitions in 2006–07
2006–07 National T20 Cup
2006 in Pakistani cricket
Pakistani cricket seasons from 2000–01